Lights on the River is a 1954 Soviet children's film directed by Viktor Eisymont. A screen version of the novel of the same name by Nikolai Dubov.

Plot 
Schoolboy from Kiev came on vacation to his uncle, a working buoy-driver on the Dnieper. Not at once, but he made friends with the local guys, and even helped his uncle to prevent the ship from crashing.

Cast
 Valery Pastukh as Kostya 
 Nina Shorina as Nyura
 Aleksandr Kopelev as Misha  
 Fedya Severin as Timosha  
 Lyosha Kozlovsky as Yegorka
 Vitali Doronin as Yefim  
 Mark Bernes as major assistant of captain
 Anna Litvinova as mother of Kostya

Criticism
The peculiarity of the story by Dubov, on the basis of which the script Lights on the River was written, lay in its bright, optimistic sound, in the truthful revelation of the characters and psychology of the children. Eisymont was largely able to preserve and convey this peculiarity of the story well. In the film lives joyful, poetic atmosphere of the children's world.

References

External links 
 
 Кино: политика и люди (30-е годы): к 100-летию мирового кино

1954 films
Soviet comedy films
1950s Russian-language films
Gorky Film Studio films
Russian children's comedy films
1950s children's comedy films
Films based on Russian novels
1954 comedy films
Soviet children's films